"The Horse Gullfaxi and the Sword Gunnföder" is an Icelandic fairy tale, included by Andrew Lang in The Crimson Fairy Book (1903). Poestion acquired the Icelandic text from his contact, "Prof. Steingrimr Thorsteinsson".

This tale was the only one in Poestion's book that he did not derive from Jón Árnason's  Vol. 2 (1862–64), and hence the only one not orally sourced. The Icelandic text "" was in the manuscript JS 287 4to, dated 1857-1870, now in the possession of the National and University Library of Iceland. The Icelandic text was eventually published in volume 4 (1956) of the full expanded edition of Jón Árnason's collection.

The variants give different names of protagonists, featured motifs, etc.

A retelling by Ruth Manning-Sanders under the title "Sigurd, the King's Son" is in her anthology, A Book of Ogres and Trolls (1972). Author Angus W. Hall also adapted the tale as Sigurd in Icelandic Fairy Tales, where the horse is named Gullfaxi ("Golden-Mane") and the sword Gunnfjöden ("Fighting Blade").

Synopsis
There was once a king whose queen bore her one son named Sigurd, but she died when the prince was ten years of age.  The king grieved his loss for a long time, until one day at the queen's grave (or haugr, a burial mound) he struck friendship with a woman named Ingiborg, and some days later the king married her. Sigurd became very fond of his stepmother.

One evening Ingiborg spoke to Sigurd and advised him to accompany the king on his hunt the following day.  When Sigurd refused, Ingiborg predicted nothing good would come out of his refusal, and hid Sigurd under the bed during the king's absence.  In a while, a giantess (or  'troll-woman' in the original) came to visit, addressing Ingiborg as her sister, pressing to know if Sigurd was home. Ingiborg entertained the giantess but persevered in denying Sigurd's presence. The process is repeated the following day, with another giantess asking for Sigurd, without success.  The giantess who arrived the third time too would leave empty-handed, so it seemed, but she cleverly managed to lay a spell, which she said would work on Sigurd if he were within earshot. The spell left him horribly disfigured, half scorched and half withered, with an irrepressible longing to seek out the giantess to gain peace of mind.

Defeating the three giantesses

Ingiborg took Sigurd from his hideout under the bed, and chastised his stubbornness, but prescribed a way to remedy the situation.
She gave him a ball (or "" ) of string, and three gold rings.  If he let the ball of string roll, it would lead him to a giantess, and though she would threaten to make a meal of him in the pot and seize him with a boat-hook, he should bribe her with the gift of one of the rings. She would then offer to wrestle with him until his strength ran out and offer him a horn to drink out of, which he should accept since a draft of this will make him strong enough to overcome her.  He was to repeat the process with her two other giantess sisters. But should Ingiborg's dog appear before him with tears running down its snout, that was the sign that her life was in imminent danger, and he should return to help his stepmother.

He followed her directions, finding all three giantesses in turn, the next giantess increasingly larger and more hideous.  Sigurd had to offer a larger ring as bribe at each turn, but he also grew more powerful with the drinking-horn offered by each of the giantesses.

Befriending Helga, the giant's daughter
The last giantess, after her defeat at the end of their bout, now steered Sigurd towards a fresh adventure, declared him "stronger than ever you were" (that is to say, no longer withered and restored to full health ""), and wishing him luck. He was to go to a nearby lake, find a little girl (called Helga) playing with a boat, and befriend her with the gift of a little gold ring that the last giantess provided. Sigurd became the girl's playmate during the day, and when evening fell, persuaded Helga to take him to her home, past her initial objection, on account of her father being a "fierce giant".

But as soon as they approached the door, Helga brandished her glove over him, transforming him into a bundle of wool (or a ", or coil" of wool), which she tossed on her bed. Her father returned, searching every corner, and declared "'This place smells of men. What's that you threw on the bed, Helga?" (He begins his line with the Icelandic equivalent of "Fee-fi-fo-fum.." in the original text.) But Helga was able to explain it was just the wool that he smelled. The next day, Helga returned to the lake with the wool bundle and restored Sigurd back to shape with her glove, and they played at the lake during the day. On the third day, her father was going out into town, which meant they had the house to themselves the whole day, and since she was given custody of all the keys, they played games opening every room. But Sigurd noticed there was one key she did not use, and asked her about it. She blushed and did not answer. He tried to sway her to show him the unopened room, when he caught glimpse of an iron door, and sweet-talked her into opening it, which she agreed to do so only partially.

Wonderful horse and sword

Inside was a horse named Gullfaxi (  +   ) "Golden Mane" and a sword named Gunnfoder "Battle-Plume". The sword was richly ornamented, and had an inscription on its  that read "He who rides this horse and wears this sword will find happiness".  Sigurd wanted to take a ride on the horse with all its trappings for one circuit, and Helga refused at first but eventually relented and revealed the name of the horse and sword. Much of the exchanged dialogue inserted here by Lang are his embellishments (e.g., "'My father is a king, but he has not got any sword so beautiful as that. Why, the jewels in the scabbard are more splendid than the big ruby in his crown! Has it got a name? Some swords have, you know.") Helga gave him "the stick and the stone and the twig" that belonged as a set with the rest. Whoever is on the horse's back can throw the twig and have a great forest appear to hinder his pursuer. If the enemy is not foiled, then he can strike (or prick) the stone with the stick and a hailstorm will kill the foe.

Helga finally relented under the condition Sigurd would only ride once around, but at the end of the circuit, Sigurd rode away.  Helga's father returned to discover the theft and ran after Sigurd riding away on Gullfaxi.  (Lang's tale calls the father a giant, but the original merely refers to him as a man or "carl".). Sigurd cast the twig to make a thickly wooded forest emerge, hoping to block his pursuer, but the giant retrieved an axe to cut it down, and was hot on his tail. So Sigurd hit (or poked) the stone causing the hailstorm killing the giant. Had Sigurd hit the stone without turning it over on the other side, he himself would have been struck and killed by the hail.

As Sigurd was riding towards his home, his stepmother's dog came running for him, and he hastened back to find nine man-servants (or  'thralls') ready to burn Ingiborg at the stake.  He struck out in anger and killed all of them with his sword (in the Icelandic original, the name  is explicitly given here). Then he set his ailing father at ease, who had mistakenly held Ingiborg responsible for the murder of his son. Sigurd brought Helga home, and they had a great marriage feast.,

Manning-Sanders' retold version
In the retold version "Sigurd the King's Son", the king met a woman (named "Ingeborg") in the wood who warned him that she was a troll's daughter; nevertheless, he had fallen in love at sight and insisted on marrying her.

Explanatory notes

References
Citations

Bibliography

 
 
 
 
  (Tale No. 6)

External links
The Horse Gullfaxi and the Sword Gunnfoder

Horse Gullfaxi and the Sword Gunnfoder